Lavello is a town and comune in the province of Potenza, in the region of Basilicata of southern Italy; it is located in the middle Ofanto valley.

History
The area of Lavello was settled in prehistoric times, as attested by findings of an Iron Age village. The town originated as a Daunian and then Roman settlement, known as Forentum. It was already an important stronghold during the Lombard rule in southern Italy, and here was killed Sicard of Benevento (839).

Lavello was an important Byzantine center and a bishopric seat from 1025. Starting from 1043 Lavello was one of the twelve baronies of the Norman county of Apulia in southern Italy. The Normans rebuilt the cathedral and added a line of walls. The fortress was strengthened under their successors, the Hohenstaufen. Here King Conrad IV of Germany died in 1254. As a result of its participation in the anti-Angevine revolt in 1268, it was burnt down by Charles I of Anjou in 1298.

Main sights

The Castle
Church of Annunziata (17th century), housing a 16th-century Annunciation from the Neapolitan School.

Famous citizens
Angelo Tartaglia - mercenary

Notes and references